Harry Archer may refer to:
Harry Archer (rugby) (born 1932), English rugby union and rugby league player
Harry Archer (composer) (1886–1960), American Broadway musical composer
Harry M. Archer, professor of medicine, and chief surgeon of the Fire Department of New York City
Harry W. Archer Jr., American politician
Harry Archer, character in Meet Corliss Archer
Harry Archer, character in Attack of the 50 Ft. Woman (1993 film) and Attack of the 50 Foot Woman

See also
Henry Archer (disambiguation)